Pinus thunbergii (syn: Pinus thunbergiana), also called black pine, Japanese black pine, and Japanese pine, is a pine tree native to coastal areas of Japan (Kyūshū, Shikoku and Honshū) and South Korea.

Description 
The bark is gray on young trees and small branches, changing to black and plated on larger branches and the trunk; becoming quite thick on older trunks. It is a widely adapted plant with attractive dark green foliage.

Ecology 
In North America this tree is subject to widespread mortality by the native American pinewood nematode, Bursaphelenchus xylophilus, spread by means of beetle vectors. Subsequently, blue stain fungus invades the plant, leading to a rapid decline and death. This nematode has also been introduced to Japan accidentally, leading to the species becoming endangered in its native area.

Uses 
Because of its resistance to pollution and salt, it is a popular horticultural tree. In Japan it is widely used as a garden tree both trained as Niwaki and untrained growing as an overstory tree.  The trunks and branches are trained from a young age to be elegant and interesting to view.  It is one of the classic bonsai subjects, requiring great patience over many years to train properly.

Second flush of growth 
One characteristic of the Japanese Black Pine that makes it desirable for bonsai, is the possibility of inducing a second flush of new growth and improved ramification in a single growing season. Unlike most pines, which are single flush plants, the Japanese Black Pine can be induced to produce new buds at the base of each spring candle by simply cutting the candles at the base as they elongate, a technique called decandling. This technique will result, in a few weeks, in the flush of multiple new buds at the base of the cut candle; each of these new buds will result in turn in new candles and branches.

Gallery

References

Further reading

External links
 Conifers Around the World: Pinus thunbergii - Japanese Black Pine.

Plants used in bonsai
Trees of Korea
Trees of Japan
Ornamental trees
thunbergii
Least concern plants